Gomo may refer to:

Chief Gomo, Pottawatomie chieftain
GoMo, Irish mobile virtual network operator owned by Eir
Gomo (musician), Portuguese Indie musician
Gomo, Tibet
Gomo (video game), a video game developed by Fishcow Games